Callisto coffeella is a moth of the family Gracillariidae found in Europe. It was first described by Johan Wilhelm Zetterstedt in 1839.

Description
The wingspan is 10–12 mm. There is one generation per year, with adults on wing in June.

The larvae feed on mountain willow (Salix arbuscula), tea-leaved willow (Salix phylicifolia), and Salix silesiaca, mining the leaves of their host plant. Young larvae make a distinctly folded lower-surface tentiform mine. After some time, this mine is vacated and the larva lives freely in a leaf margin that has been folded downwards and is secured with silk. In small leaves the two halves are simply spun together in a pod. Two of these leaf folds are made and eaten out.

Distribution
The moth is found from Fennoscandia and northern Russia to the Pyrenees, Italy and Romania and from Scotland to Ukraine.

References

External links

Gracillariinae
Moths described in 1839
Moths of Europe
Taxa named by Johan Wilhelm Zetterstedt